Colyn is a given name and surname. Notable people with the name include:

 Alexander Colyn (1527–1612), Flemish sculptor
 Colyn Fischer (born 1977), American violinist
 Simon Colyn (born 2002), Canadian soccer player

See also
 Colin (given name)
 Colin (surname)